There have been four pinball adaptations of the film Jurassic Park franchise: a physical table released by Data East the same year the film came out, Sega's 1997 The Lost World which is based on the second movie of the series, a virtual table developed by Zen Studios on the franchise's 25th anniversary and a new physical table released by Stern Pinball a year after.  All four tables behave differently.

Original Data East version

Gameplay
There are 11 gameplay modes, called "Computer Screens". They are started by shooting the right scoop, called "Control Room", when it is lit. These modes are stackable (i.e., one mode can be running while another mode is in progress). The Control Room is briefly lit by the right ramp or either inlane, and is permanently lit by shooting the Power Shed (the right scoop) on the upper-right side of the playfield.

Stampede
Escape Isla Nublar
Raptor Two-Ball: Lights the Boat Dock (saucer at the right loop) for Raptor Two-Ball multiball. Shooting the Raptor Pit collects the ball and gives 2 more.
Electric Fence: You have to hit the pop bumpers a certain number of times to get Timmy off the electric fence, before he gets electrocuted.
Spitter Attack
System Boot: Shoot the Bunker, the Control Room, and the Power Shed scoops to collect a maximum of 30 million points.
Raptors' Rampage
Mosquito Millions
Feed T-Rex: Shoot the T-Rex saucer to feed the "goat" (ball) to the T-Rex for 30 million points.
Bone Busting
Light Extra Ball: Extra Ball is lit at the Boat Docks.

Completing all Computer Screen modes lights the Control Room for System Failure, a six-ball "wizard mode" where all shots on the playfield are worth one million points. It lasts for 45 seconds.

Zen Studios
In the late 2010s, two additional pinball adaptations of the film were released.  The second pinball adaptation of Jurassic Park is a virtual table developed by Zen Studios as one of three tables in the Jurassic Park pinball pack, designed to celebrate the franchise's 25th anniversary, which is an add-on for Pinball FX 3 that was released on February 20, 2018.

In addition to developing a digital pinball adaptation of the film, Zen Studios also developed another pinball table that reflects on its aftermath, titled Jurassic Park: Pinball Mayhem, which is also one of the three tables in the aforementioned Jurassic Park pinball pack.

Stern 2019 release

Stern Pinball released a third pinball adaptation of the film in 2019.

Stern created three versions: Pro, Premium and Limited Edition.  All models feature a unique spinning kinetic newton ball Jungle Explorer Vehicle, three flippers, four ramps and a custom T-Rex sculpt.  Premium and Limited Edition models feature a motorized animatronic ball eating, ball throwing, T-Rex mechanism and an interactive Raptor Pen ball lock mechanism.  The game features John Williams Jurassic Park score.

The Limited Edition model is limited to 500 units and features a numbered plaque, custom themed backglass, cabinet artwork and art blades as well as a shaker motor and anti-reflection glass.

Samples of Wayne Knight's voice featured in the original motion picture is sampled in the game.

Game overview and objectives
Dennis Nedry's computer virus continues to send Jurassic Park into chaos.  The dinosaurs are loose on the island and the employees are in danger.  The player has to rescue the staff and capture the dinosaurs and eventually stage an escape.

Shoot lit white arrows to spell MAP, then the left ramp to enter a Paddock. In any Paddock, shoot the flashing red “rescue” shots until the yellow “trap” targets light. Hit as many as required, then capture the dinosaur by hitting the yellow / green flashing shot.
Completing certain tasks lights the left target for Control Room. Three modes are available and can be chosen using the flippers and action button.
Hitting the truck three times starts a T-Rex hurry-up that leads into a Multiball. Every four times after that, it will light one of three modes at the left ramp.
Spelling C-H-A-O-S in order, then hitting the target between the bumpers starts Chaos Multiball.
Locking a ball in the center of the raptor pit, then hitting the raptor pit enough times starts Raptor Tri-Ball.
Shooting the right ramp enough times starts Pteranodon Attack. Build up a switch value, then shoot the right ramp to collect it.
If “Smart Missile” is lit at the left return lane from enough “rescue” shots, use the action button to select which reward you want, then shoot the target between the bumpers.
Hit the three purple standups, then the large standup near the side ramp for helpful supply drops and 2x scoring. Make upper loop shots to light the large standup for even better rewards.

Skill shots and multiball

There are various skill shots and multiballs throughout the game.  The skill shot on Jurassic Park is a combo sequence: following a full plunge, the left ramp must first be shot, then the right ramp, then the side ramp, then the right orbit.  Each shot in the sequence awards 2x, 4x and 6x the base value.  There are also secret skill shots and the MXV skill shot.

There are three different multiballs:  CHAOS multiball, Raptor Tri-Ball and King of the Island multiball.

Mini wizard modes

Three mini-wizard modes exist - one for making it to the end of the map, one for playing all Control Room modes, and one for playing all T. Rex modes. Playing all three of these modes is a requirement to unlock Escape Nublar.

 Visitor's Center (Raptors in the Kitchen) Wizard Mode:  Navigate the truck to the Visitor's Center to begin.
 Secure Control Room Wizard Mode:  Starts upon completion of the control room modes.
 Museum Mayhem Wizard Mode:  Starts upon completion of the T-Rex events.

Escape Nublar wizard mode
Upon completion of all three mini-wizard modes, Escape Nublar Wizard begins.   The goal of Escape Nublar is to navigate back through the Paddocks to the main gate and Helipad while rescuing any remaining staff and dinosaurs before the volcano erupts. This is a single-ball wizard mode where you have three “balls” (trucks) to complete the mode.  Each Paddock consists of two phases:  Rescue Phase and Navigate Phase.

When Dinosaurs Ruled the Earth wizard mode
A super wizard mode, available at the left ramp after completing "Escape Nublar". It's a timed 6 balls multiball.

Stern accessories
Stern offered accessories for Jurassic Park as well:

Jurassic Park topper:  This topper interacts with your game by capturing dinosaurs to light a letter in Jurassic Park. Your letter progress carries over from game to game. Spell Jurassic Park for a special mode (Goat Mania). 
Jurassic Park inside art blades
Jurassic Park side armor
Jurassic Park shooter knob: The shooter knob is crowned with an egg-shaped amber globe, housing a suspended fossilized mosquito.

See also
The Lost World: Jurassic Park (pinball)

References

External links
  (1993 Data East Version)
 Pinball Archive rule sheet
 Many high resolution photos
 (2019 Stern Pro version)
 (2019 Stern Premium version)
 (2019 Stern Limited Edition version)

1993 pinball machines
Jurassic Park pinball machines
Pinball machines based on films
Data East pinball machines
2019 pinball machines
Stern pinball machines